The Men's 81 kg competition at the 2017 World Judo Championships was held on 31 August 2017.

Results

Finals

Repechage

Pool A

Pool B
First round fights

Pool C

Pool D
First round fights

Prize money
The sums listed bring the total prizes awarded to 57,000$ for the individual event.

References

External links
 
 Draw

M81
World Judo Championships Men's Half Middleweight